"Do You Believe in Miracles" is a song by the British rock band Slade, released in 1985 as a single which was included on the band's studio/compilation album Crackers: The Christmas Party Album. It was written by lead vocalist Noddy Holder and bassist Jim Lea, and produced by John Punter. It reached No. 54 in the UK, remaining in the charts for six weeks.

Background
Following their 1985 studio album Rogues Gallery, Slade were approached by Telstar to create a Christmas-related party album. Alongside this new project, the band recorded a charity single, "Do You Believe in Miracles", which was released in November 1985. The single raised funds for charity, with all publishing royalties being donated equally to the Band Aid Trust and British Children in Need (N.S.P.C.C.). Despite receiving regular airplay on radio, the song peaked at No. 54 in the UK. In a 1988 fan club interview, Lea revealed: "Certainly a few thousand pounds have been paid over and I keep getting these very nice letters all the time saying "Thank you very much, Mr Lea"."

"Do You Believe in Miracles" was inspired by Bob Geldof and the benefit concert Live Aid, which Slade were not invited to perform at. Holder's lyrics reflected his thoughts on Geldof's achievement with Live Aid, while also referencing Slade's past encounter with him in the late 1970s, at a time when the band's popularity was low. Appearing on the TV show Juice in 1985, Lea spoke of the song: "It's about Bob Geldof actually and when the group was down the nick he came to see us, and he said "How can a group that's so big be playing a little club like you're playing now". And we said "Well, we just decided to carry on, we didn't want to pack up." And he said "Oh, I couldn't do that" but he did, and then he did the Live Aid thing, and I thought it was worth writing a song about."

Later in 1986, Lea recalled of the song's airplay: ""Do You Believe in Miracles" was played to death on the beeb. I really believed in that record." Drummer Don Powell said: "It didn't do too well chartwise, but it had every radio play in the book really. I could never turn the radio on without hearing it played. We did quite a few T.V. shows to promote it - but when we recorded them, when the record first came out - all the T.V. shows centred around Christmas, so we missed out on the initial thing. If we'd have had those T.V.'s when the record was actually released, that would have helped a lot more."

Release
"Do You Believe in Miracles" was released on 7" and 12" vinyl by RCA Records in the UK, Australia, Ecuador and across Europe, including Germany and the Netherlands. The B-side, "My Oh My (Swing Version)", was exclusive to the single and would later appear on the band's 2007 compilation B-Sides. On the 12" single, an extended version of "Do You Believe in Miracles" was featured as the A-side, and a second B-side, "Time to Rock", was taken from the Rogues Gallery album. The band had not intended for "Do You Believe in Miracles" to be included on the Crackers album, however Telstar insisted that it was included on there.

In the UK, a limited double-pack Christmas edition of the single was also released on 7" and 12" vinyl. Dubbed "The Slade Christmas Pack", the 7" version included the standard 7" single along with a second 7" vinyl featuring "Santa Claus Is Coming to Town" as the A-side and "Auld Lang Syne/You'll Never Walk Alone" as the B-side. Both tracks were from the Crackers album. The 12" version featured the same three tracks as on the standard 12" version, with the two Crackers tracks added.

Promotion
A music video was filmed to promote the single, which was directed by Phillip Davey. The video featured three sequences. One was filmed in an attic with Holder dressed in a jacket, peering through a telescope, plotting the course of Halley's Comet. The second featured the band performing the song in front of a white curtain backdrop which was blown to create a wind-tunnel effect. The third sequence had the band performing the song in front of a live audience, with the band sitting on stage, all with acoustic guitars except Powell. The final shot showed the band together in the attic. In the UK, the band performed the song on the TV shows Krankies, Razzmatazz and Saturday Superstore.

Critical reception
In a review of the single, Australian newspaper The Age (published in Melbourne) commented: "Even if Bob Geldof misses out on this year's Nobel Peace Prize for his Live Aid triumph, at least he would have been immortalised in song by Slade. This ditty is a tribute to Geldof's efforts."

Formats
7" Single
"Do You Believe in Miracles" - 4:11
"My Oh My (Swing Version)" - 3:02

7" Single (Australian release)
"Do You Believe in Miracles" - 4:11
"Time to Rock" - 4:08

7" Single (Ecuadorian promo)
"Do You Believe in Miracles" - 4:11
"My Oh My (Swing Version)" - 3:02

7" UK Christmas Pack Single
"Do You Believe in Miracles" - 4:11
"My Oh My (Swing Version)" - 3:02
"Santa Claus Is Coming to Town" - 2:39
"Auld Lang Syne/You'll Never Walk Alone" - 3:28

12" Single
"Do You Believe in Miracles (Extended Version)" - 6:12
"My Oh My (Swing Version)" - 3:02
"Time to Rock" - 4:08

12" UK Christmas Pack Single
"Do You Believe in Miracles" - 4:11
"My Oh My (Swing Version)" - 3:02
"Time to Rock" - 4:08
"Santa Claus Is Coming to Town" - 2:39
"Auld Lang Syne/You'll Never Walk Alone" - 3:28

Chart performance

Personnel
Slade
Noddy Holder - lead vocals
Jim Lea - bass, synthesiser, backing vocals, producer of "Time to Rock", "Santa Claus is Coming to Town" and "Auld Lang Syne/You'll Never Walk Alone", arranger
Dave Hill - lead guitar, backing vocals
Don Powell - drums

Additional personnel
John Punter - producer of "Do You Believe in Miracles"
Monty Babson - producer of "My Oh My (Swing Version)"
Stan Butcher - arranger on "My Oh My (Swing Version)"
The Clinic - sleeve design, illustration

References

1985 songs
1985 singles
Slade songs
RCA Records singles
Songs written by Noddy Holder
Songs written by Jim Lea
Charity singles
Song recordings produced by John Punter